Stanley is a former colliery town and civil parish in County Durham, North East England. Centred on a hilltop between Chester-le-Street and Consett, the town lies south west of Gateshead.

Stanley was formerly divided into three distinct settlements – the main town of West Stanley and the mining villages of East Stanley and South Stanley. Through a process of gradual expansion, these have become amalgamated into one town, with East and South Stanley no longer officially used as town names (although they are still recognised colloquially).

The civil parish of Stanley was created in 2007 and takes in not only Stanley, but the villages of Annfield Plain, Tanfield, Craghead, Catchgate, Tantobie, Tanfield Lea, South Moor, White-le-Head, Bloemfontein, Clough Dene, Greencroft, Harelaw, Kip Hill, The Middles, New Kyo, No Place, Oxhill, Quaking Houses, Shield Row, and West Kyo. The current parish covers the vast majority of the former Stanley Urban District Council area, with the exception of Dipton and Burnopfield.

History
Stanley was first mentioned in 1211; however, some neolithic and Roman remains have been found in the area. The town's name is derived from the Old English stān and lēah, meaning "stony woodland clearing".

In John Speed's map of Co. Durham Stanley appears called Standley.

The West Stanley Pit Disaster, one of the worst coal mining disasters in British history, took place at West Stanley Colliery on 16 February 1909 when more than 160 people were killed in the Burns Pit disaster.

Over recent decades, Stanley has suffered hard times economically, with the closure of the coal pits followed by the loss of major employers at Ever Ready in nearby Tanfield, as well as the closure of both the British Steel plant and Shotley Bridge General Hospital in the neighbouring town of Consett. Local businesses in Stanley town centre were also significantly affected by the development of the giant MetroCentre shopping complex in nearby Gateshead, with local trade decreasing as a result.

In 1999, Stanley briefly garnered attention in various national tabloid newspapers as well as BBC Radio 1's Chris Moyles Show when local curry house impresario Harresh Ramadan turned his Indian takeaway restaurant on Front Street into a fish-and-chip shop and renamed it Harry Ramadan's, a spoof on the more famous and well-known Harry Ramsden's chain, with signage in an identical font and colours.  The Harry Ramsden's chain sued, citing breach of copyright, with Ramadan backing down shortly after the national publicity had subsided.  Soon thereafter, the shop took on new ownership and adopted the new name Jump 4 Joy's before closing down entirely in 2001.

In October 2003, plans by Archer and Rostron Ltd. to convert the derelict King's Head pub into a private sex club to be re-christened The Love Shack caused controversy, with over 500 local residents registering formal objections to the plan.  Faced with this opposition, the company dropped its proposals to open a swingers club on the site and instead converted the venue into a hotel and health spa called The Local Spa.

In 2005, the Office of the Deputy Prime Minister granted permission to plans to form a Stanley Town Council. This followed a campaign by local people, including a petition of over 2000 names, representing 10% of the population that would be covered by the new Town Council. Campaigners promised that the new Town Council would increase the pace of regeneration within the town.

In 2008, an arson attack left a historic building on Stanley Front Street in ruins along with a billiards club and several shops below.  November 2008 saw the demolition of the burnt buildings.

Governance
Durham County Council was created in 1888 and covered the whole of County Durham.

The Urban District Council area of Stanley was created in 1894. Prior to this, Stanley had been administered for the purposes of the Poor Law and sanitation by the Lanchester Union.  The initial Stanley District comprised West Stanley, Shield Row and South Moor, whilst separate Urban District Councils were created in Annfield Plain and Tanfield. After a governance review in 1937, the three Councils were combined and Craghead was transferred from the Lanchester Rural District to form a larger Stanley Urban District.

Under the local government re-organisation of 1974, Stanley Urban District was merged with the Consett Urban and Lanchester Rural Districts to create Derwentside District Council, which was the lower tier authority until a further re-organisation in 2009 abolished all the District Councils in County Durham and combined all local government functions into a unitary authority under Durham County Council.

Politically the local authority is dominated by the Labour Party, with 7 of the town's 8 allotted seats on Durham County Council being held by the party. The town lies in the North Durham Parliamentary constituency, which it shares with Chester-le-Street, and is represented at Westminster by Labour MP Kevan Jones. Prior to 1983 the town formed part of the Consett constituency (now part of North West Durham). The electoral ward named Stanley had at the 2011 Census a population of 9,053.

Geography
The town now stretches into what were formerly neighbouring villages and towns such as Annfield Plain to the west and Beamish and Pelton to the east.

Economy
In recent decades, with the decline of traditional industries and the encroachment of large supermarkets and chain stores, 'Old Stanley' has declined, with many locally owned shops and pubs closing.

The town's main shopping area, Front Street, is pedestrianised, housing independent shops alongside large chains such as Boots. A market is held on Front Street on Thursdays and Saturdays. There are also supermarkets such as Asda and Iceland located within the town. Tesco may construct a new supermarket on the Clifford Road Retail Complex site, which currently accommodates the Clearance Bargains store and a range of empty buildings that had previously housed Kwik Save, Presto, a furniture shop, and an indoor market. Tesco continued to own the land but subsequently sold it to TJ Morris. The former Kwik Save site was then redeveloped into a large Home Bargains store, opening in July 2018. The store created 60 new jobs for the area.

Stanley has also added a Domino's, a larger Greggs store (both opening December 2022) and a drive-thru Starbucks (opened in March 2023) in a newly developed site off of Agnes Street.

Refurbishment of Stanley town centre in recent years has seen the opening of a new solar-powered bus interchange and an extension to the Louisa Centre leisure facility incorporating a new town swimming pool. A new health centre, Stanley Primary Care Centre, was opened in February 2010 along with a Sure Start children's centre.

Education

As well as a number of primary schools, Stanley has two secondary schools. These are:
 North Durham Academy (in South Stanley – connected to South Stanley Infants and Juniors)
 Tanfield School,  (in Tanfield next to Stanley)

The town is also served by St Bede's Catholic School and Sixth Form College, based in the nearby village of Lanchester.

Leisure

The Sustrans C2C Cycle Route, a 140-mile (230 km) bicycle route connecting Whitehaven on the west coast of Cumbria to Sunderland on England's north east coast, passes along the southern boundary of Stanley.

The Louisa Centre contains various sport and leisure facilities including a fitness suite, 25-metre swimming pool, a nursery and meeting rooms.

The Lamplight Arts Centre, founded in 1960 and entirely refurbished in 2003, hosts concerts and recitals by local and national musical acts as well as small plays, exhibitions, classes and seminars.

Stanley is renowned for its annual summer playscheme situated at Stanley Youth Centre. This has been running since 1972 and is organised and run by a group of local people, recruiting international volunteers through YAP (Youth Action for Peace). The scheme runs for the first two weeks of the summer holiday, with children participating in games, activities and trips to local cultural and leisure venues.

Stanley Youth Centre offered activities to young people Monday to Friday during school term as well as a summer programme. Located at the top of Tyne Road, facilities included a sports hall, pool table, table tennis, meeting rooms and coffee bar. The range of activities available included DJing, volunteering, Duke of Edinburgh Award, babysitting, first aid and youth work courses. The centre closed in 2016 after many decades of work with young people.

From 1993 – 2007, the first weekend in August saw a number of local, national and international Blues artists and renowned musical acts descend on the town for the Stanley Blues Festival.
In 2005, The Animals played a set which went down well with locals and visitors alike.  However, as of early 2008, organisers announced that the Festival was to be discontinued due to insufficient funding.

Notable people
Alun Armstrong, actor, from Annfield Plain
The Horsley Brothers (David and William J Horsley), the founders of Hollywood as the centre of the US film industry
Glenn McCrory, IBF World boxing champion (1989–1990), from Annfield Plain
Jonathan Roddam II, Hillary Clinton's great grandfather
Yvonne Ridley, a journalist active in the Middle East; formerly a captive of the Taliban.
Barry Venison, former professional footballer and television pundit
Brian Tinnion, former Newcastle United and Bristol City footballer, from Burnopfield
Carly Telford, Notts County Ladies F.C. and England women's national football team goalkeeper. Part of the World Cup 2015 third place team.
 Frank Keegan, one of the heroes of the 1909 West Stanley Burns Pit disaster and Kevin Keegan's grandfather
 Tom Lamb, former miner who became an artist, depicting the scenes of the underground life of miners.
 Mak Wilson from Shield Row. Puppeteer with The Jim Henson Company, The Muppets, Spitting Image and the BBC. Films include Labyrinth, Teenage Mutant Ninja Turtles, Babe and Muppets Most Wanted.
 Kim Darroch, retired senior diplomat, former British Ambassador to the United States, from South Stanley.

References

 
Towns in County Durham
Civil parishes in County Durham